Key West International Airport  is an international airport located in the City of Key West in Monroe County, Florida, United States,  east of the main commercial center of Key West.

History

Key West's aviation history began in 1913 with a flight to Cuba by Augustin Parla. In 1928, Pan American Airways began scheduled flights from Key West. The main runway at Meacham Field was pressed into U.S. Army use after the Pearl Harbor attack, as well as into U.S. Navy use later in World War II as an alternative to the Trumbo Point seaplane base and the main Naval Air Station for fixed-wing and lighter-than-air (blimp) aircraft on Boca Chica Key. After the war, the city took over what became Key West Municipal Airport. In January 1953, the city gave Monroe County the title to Meacham Field, allowing the county to apply for Federal Aviation Administration grants. Around the same time, the airport became Key West International Airport.

National Airlines began flights to Miami in 1944 with Lockheed Lodestar twin prop aircraft, although the airport did not have a paved runway until around 1956. National served Key West for nearly 25 years and later operated Convair 340 and Convair 440 prop aircraft, as well as Lockheed L-188 Electra turboprops, into the airport. In 1968, National began the first jet flights into Key West with Boeing 727-100s, providing nonstop service to Miami. By 1969, National was operating daily 727 jet service direct to Washington National Airport, Philadelphia International Airport, and John F. Kennedy International Airport via intermediate stops in Miami, West Palm Beach, and Orlando.

Several other airlines also began operating jet service into Key West. In 1979, Air Florida was operating five nonstop flights a day to Miami with Boeing 737 jetliners. In 1987, Eastern Airlines was operating daily mainline Boeing 727-100 jet service nonstop to Miami. By 1989, Piedmont Airlines was operating six nonstop flights a day to Miami with Fokker F28 Fellowship twin jets. This F28 jet service was then continued by USAir following its acquisition of and merger with Piedmont.  Southwest Airlines, following its acquisition of AirTran in 2011, operated Boeing 737-700 jet service into the airport, including nonstop flights from New Orleans, Orlando, and Tampa. However, in 2014, Southwest subsequently ceased all service to the airport.

As of May 9, 2010, the flight schedule included commercial service on United Express, American Eagle, Delta Air Lines, Delta Connection and, most notably, AirTran Airways. Delta and AirTran were both operating Boeing 737-700 jet service into Key West by 2009.  Nonstop routes to EYW in 2010 included Atlanta on Delta, Orlando and Tampa on AirTran Airways, and Fort Lauderdale and Tampa on United Express (although neither FLL or TPA was the location of a United Airlines hub).

A number of commuter and regional airlines also served Key West with turboprop and prop aircraft during the 1980s and 1990s primarily with nonstop flights to Miami but also with nonstop service to Fort Lauderdale, Fort Myers, Naples, Orlando and Tampa.  According to the Official Airline Guide (OAG), these air carriers included Air Florida Commuter, Airways International, American Eagle Airlines, Bar Harbor Airlines (operating Eastern Express code sharing service for Eastern Airlines), Cape Air, Comair (operating Delta Connection code sharing service for Delta Air Lines), Dolphin Airlines, Gulfstream International Airlines (operating independently and later as Continental Connection with code sharing services for  Continental Airlines), Gull Air, Pan Am Express, Paradise Island Airlines (operating code sharing service for Carnival Air Lines),  Pro Air Services, Provincetown-Boston Airlines (PBA), Southeast Airlines, Southern Express and USAir Express.  Turboprop aircraft operated into the airport included the ATR-42, British Aerospace BAe Jetstream 31, Beechcraft 1900C, Beechcraft 1900D, Beechcraft C99, CASA 212 Aviocar, de Havilland Canada DHC-7 Dash 7, de Havilland Canada DHC-8 Dash 8, Embraer EMB-110 Bandeirante, Embraer EMB-120 Brasilia, Nord 262 and Saab 340.  American Eagle later operated ATR-72 propjets into the airport before introducing regional jet service.  Delta Connection subsequently introduced regional jet service as well.  Piston engine twin prop aircraft flown by commuter air carriers serving Key West included the Cessna 402, Douglas DC-3, Martin 2-0-2, Martin 4-0-4 and Piper Navajo.

On July 15, 2017, Key West International Airport was awarded a grant of $6.5 million by the FAA to assist in a $10 million runway project. The project added 277 feet to the runway for takeoffs and landings as well as added 10 feet-wide shoulders paved on each side of the runway. Construction work began in January 2018 and all construction was done at night.

Facilities

Key West International Airport covers 334 acres (135 ha) at an elevation of 3 feet (1 m). Its one runway, 09/27, is 5,076 by 100 feet (1,547 x 30 m) asphalt.

The airport has two terminals designed by Mark Mosko and Dwane Stark of URS; Mosko also worked on Baltimore–Washington International Airport. The older ground-level terminal building opened in 1957 and now serves arriving passengers. The terminal was expanded with the addition of a second building elevated over the parking lot in February 2009. The newer building includes an elevated roadway and houses ticketing, check-in, and the airport's security checkpoint. The older building was then renovated with the former ticketing area becoming an expanded departure gate lounge, and the baggage claim area was then expanded into the former departure lounge. The two buildings are connected by an enclosed walkway.

Parking for 300 vehicles is at ground level beneath the newer terminal—150 spaces for rental cars and 150 for the public.

In 2011, the airport had 62,293 aircraft operations, averaging 170 per day: 71% general aviation, 16% air taxi, 13% airline, and <1% military. At the time, 59 aircraft were based at the airport: 61% single-engine, 37% multi-engine, and 2% helicopter.

Airlines and destinations

Allegiant Air currently operates the Airbus A319 jetliner into Key West.

American Eagle operate E175 regional jets into Key West on behalf of American Airlines. On December 18, 2019, American began flying mainline Airbus A319 jetliners nonstop between Key West and Dallas/Fort Worth.  American also currently operates A319 jetliners nonstop between Key West and Chicago O'Hare Airport, Charlotte, and Philadelphia.

Delta Air Lines currently operates mainline jet service into the airport with Airbus A319 jetliners. Key West's 5,076-foot runway is the shortest runway in North America used regularly by A319s.  Delta's regional affiliate, Delta Connection (operated by Endeavor Air), operates CRJ700 regional jets on flights from Atlanta.

JetBlue operates the Airbus A220-300 on flights from Boston and  New York.

Silver Airways operates ATR 42-600 and ATR 72-600 aircraft.

United Express currently operates the E170 and E175 for service to Newark, Chicago O'Hare, and Houston-Intercontinental.

Statistics

Annual traffic
Key West's traffic was generally fairly stagnant to start the new millennium but gradually began increasing at the end of the 2000s with the addition of the new terminal and the introduction of low-cost jet service operated by AirTran, as well as mainline jet service by Delta.

When Southwest acquired AirTran in 2011, it continued to operate flights from the airport, first under the AirTran brand and then under the Southwest brand with Boeing 737-700 jetliners. Southwest Airlines ended service to Key West Airport in 2014.

Top destinations

Airline market share

Accidents and incidents
 On April 25, 1959, a Vickers Viscount of Cubana de Aviación was hijacked on a flight from Varadero to Havana. The aircraft landed at Key West.
 On March 19, 2003, Aerotaxi Flight 882, operated by Douglas DC-3C CU-T1192, was hijacked on a flight from Rafael Cabrera Airport in Nueva Gerona, Cuba to José Martí International Airport in Havana. The six hijackers were detained upon the plane's landing at Key West.
 On April 2, 2003, a Cubana de Aviación flight scheduled from Siguanea Airport to José Martí International Airport, operated by a Antonov An-24, was hijacked and landed in Key West.  As of 2021, the plane had remained in Key West and was being used as a training facility for fire and police.
 On October 31, 2011, a Gulfstream G150 carrying NASCAR team owner Rick Hendrick ran off the end of Key West's runway after experiencing a loss in braking action upon landing. The jet, owned by NASCAR driver Jimmie Johnson, suffered nose gear damage.
 On November 2, 2011, a Cessna Citation crash landed in Key West. The flight, which originated in Fort Lauderdale, had a brake failure upon landing. Two pilots were on board along with two passengers. Only minor injuries were reported. The aircraft was stopped by the airport's newly installed EMAS system.

References

External links
 Key West International Airport page at Monroe County website
 Aerial image as of February 1999 from USGS The National Map
  brochure from CFASPP
 
 

Airports in Florida
Airports in Monroe County, Florida
Airport
Airport
Airport